Lawrence Davies (born 3 September 1977) is a Welsh former professional footballer who played as a striker. He made 17 appearances in the Football League, and represented his country at youth level.

Career
Davies was born in Abergavenny, Wales. He began his football career in England as a trainee with Leeds United, and played for Wales youth's 1995 Milk Cup-winning team, before moving on to Bradford City in 1997. He made his Football League debut while on loan at Third Division club Darlington in December 1997, and made four First Division appearances for his parent club later that season. A loan spell at Hartlepool United in 1998 was interrupted by injury, and he moved on in February 1999 to Brighton & Hove Albion, where he appeared in eight Third Division matches, mainly as a substitute. He then returned to Wales where he played for Welsh Premier League clubs Barry Town, Carmarthen Town and Cwmbrân Town.

References

1977 births
Living people
Sportspeople from Abergavenny
Welsh footballers
Wales youth international footballers
Association football forwards
Leeds United F.C. players
Bradford City A.F.C. players
Darlington F.C. players
Hartlepool United F.C. players
Brighton & Hove Albion F.C. players
Barry Town United F.C. players
Carmarthen Town A.F.C. players
Cwmbrân Town A.F.C. players
English Football League players
Cymru Premier players